The FA Youth Cup sponsored by E.ON 2010–11 was the 59th edition of the FA Youth Cup. 460 clubs were initially accepted, with 53 teams being new entries.

The competition consisted of several rounds and was preceded by a qualifying competition, starting with the preliminary round, which was followed by four qualifying rounds for non-League teams. Football League teams entered the draw thereafter, with League One and League Two teams entering at the first round, and Premier League and Championship teams entering in the third round.

Calendar

Fixtures and results

First round

† After extra time

Second round

† After extra time

Third round

† After extra time

Fourth round

† After extra time

Fifth round

† After extra time

Quarter-finals

Semi-finals

|}

First leg

Second leg

Final

First leg

Second leg

See also
 2010–11 Premier Academy League
 2010–11 Premier Reserve League
 2010–11 FA Cup
 2010–11 in English football

References

External links
 The FA Youth Cup at The Football Association official website

FA Youth Cup seasons
FA
Fa Youth Cup, 2010-11